Marie-Claire van Stevens (born 22 May 1948 in Vilvoorde) is a Belgian archer.

Archery

Van Stevens competed in the 1984 Summer Olympic Games. She came 22nd with 2431 points in the women's individual event.

She took part in the World Archery Championships in 1987 and 1989 finishing 46th and 51st respectively.

In 2019 she won the recurve women 70+ category at the 2019 European Masters Games.

References

External links 
 Profile on worldarchery.org

1948 births
Living people
Belgian female archers
Olympic archers of Belgium
Archers at the 1984 Summer Olympics
People from Vilvoorde
Sportspeople from Flemish Brabant